Jordi Sánchez Zaragoza (born 13 May 1964) is a Spanish actor and screenwriter, mostly known for his role as Antonio Recio in La que se avecina and Josep Lopes in Plats bruts. He got a Certificate of Advanced Study on nursing at the Universidad Autónoma de Barcelona.

He appeared in TV 3 with Joel Joan for the Twelve Grapes at the 2001 New Year's Eve. In 2011 he published Humanos que me encontré, an autobiographical novel about his childhood and adolescence. In 2015 he wrote the stage play El eunuco, based on The Eunuch by Terence.

He appeared in the comedy film Bajo el mismo techo (2019), starring with Silvia Abril.

Work as a writer and dramatist

Television 

 L'un per l'altre, with Pep Antón Gómez, Sergi Pompermayer y David Plana.
 Plats bruts, with Joel Joan.
 La que se avecina, with Laura Caballero y Alberto Caballero.

Theatre 

 El eunuco, with Pep Antón Gómez
 Mitad y mitad, with Pep Antón Gómez
 Asesinos todos, with Pep Antón Gómez
 Hoy no cenamos, with Pep Antón Gómez
 Excusas, with Joel Joan
 Soy fea, con Sergi Belbel
 Krámpack 
 Fum, fum, fum
 Mareig

Cinema 
 Amigos...
 Todo irá bien
 Se vende
 Excusas

Work as an actor

Theatre 
 Mareig (1993)
 Yvonne, princesa de Borgoña (1993)
 El mercader de Venecia (1994)
 El avaro (1996)
 Sóc lletja (1997)
 Soy fea (1998)
 Kràmpack (1998)
 Excuses (2000)
 Sexos (2003)
 El trámite (2015)

Cinema

Notes

References

External links
 

1964 births
Living people
21st-century Spanish male actors
Actors from Barcelona